Gävle–Sandviken Airport, also called Gestrike Airport, is a public airport in Sweden, with a single runway  long and  wide.

The airport is used for taxi flights, ambulance flights, photo flights for Lantmäteriet (Swedish National Land Survey), and private planes. The airport sells jet fuel from 8:00 AM to 4:00 PM CET.

History 
Gävle Airport was built and opened in 1971 for Sweden's military. Between 1971 and 2000 there was scheduled passenger traffic to Stockholm. There has also been traffic to Gothenburg and some charter destinations. The traffic was never really profitable, and better roads and railways have taken over the traffic. In 1999, Sweden's defense ministry transferred ownership and responsibility of the airport to the Gävle municipality.

Flying Clubs  
Three flying clubs operate out of Gävle Airport: Gavle District's Flying Club, Valbo Flying Club, and Western Gastrikeleden Flying Club. Additionally, Wermlandsflyg Operations has operated a flying shop in Gävle Airport since 2015.

References

Airports in Sweden